Hypocalymma connatum is a member of the family Myrtaceae endemic to Western Australia.

References

connatum
Endemic flora of Western Australia
Rosids of Western Australia
Critically endangered flora of Australia
Plants described in 2002
Taxa named by Gregory John Keighery
Taxa named by Arne Strid